The 1990–91 Ohio State Buckeyes men's basketball team represented Ohio State University as a member of the Big Ten Conference during the 1990–91 NCAA men's college basketball season. The team was led by second-year head coach Randy Ayers and played their home games at St. John Arena. After starting the season on a 17-game win streak and winning 25 of their first 26 games, the Buckeyes finished with an overall record of 27–4, and earned their first Big Ten championship in 20 years with a 15–3 conference record.

Roster

Schedule and results

|-
!colspan=8| NCAA tournament

Rankings

References

External links
1990-91 OHIO STATE BASKETBALL STATISTICS at Ohiostatebuckeyes.com
1990-91 Ohio State Buckeyes Roster and Stats at Sports-Reference.com
Ohio State Men's Basketball 2019-20 Guide, pp. 166–188.

Ohio State Buckeyes men's basketball seasons
Ohio State Buckeyes
Ohio State
Ohio State Buckeyes
Ohio State Buckeyes